Léandre Gaël Tawamba Kana (born 20 December 1989) is a Cameroonian professional footballer who plays for Al-Taawoun as a forward.

Early into his career, Tawamba played as a centre-back and defensive midfielder, but was converted into a forward after arriving in Europe.

Club career

Early career
Born in Yaoundé, Tawamba was a regular member of Cameroon's Elite One side Aigle Royal Menoua in the 2007–08 season. He later moved to Union Douala, spending there the 2009–10 campaign. In 2011, Tawamba returned to his former club Aigle Royal Menoua, captaining the team in the nation's Elite Two.

South Africa and Slovakia
In early 2012, Tawamba moved abroad to South Africa and joined FC Cape Town. He scored once in the second half of the 2011–12 National First Division. In June 2012, Tawamba traveled to Slovakia and trained with Slovan Bratislava and Ružomberok, before returning to South Africa and joining National First Division side Mpumalanga Black Aces. He was ultimately transferred to Slovak club Nitra in early 2013. Until the end of the 2012–13 season, Tawamba scored three times in 14 league appearances.

In June 2013, Tawamba switched to Ružomberok, rejoining his Nitra manager Jozef Vukušič. He netted on his league debut on 14 July, scoring the equalizer in a 2–2 draw with Žilina. On 10 August, Tawamba scored a brace in a 3–2 home win over Spartak Trnava. He finished the season as the team's top scorer with 13 goals in 31 appearances.

Libya
In July 2014, Tawamba returned to Africa and signed with Libyan club Al-Ahly Benghazi, again following his former manager Jozef Vukušič. He represented the side in the 2014 CAF Champions League exclusively, appearing in two games of the group stage against Tunisia's CS Sfaxien and Espérance.

Return to Slovakia
In early 2015, Tawamba returned to Slovakia and joined Zlaté Moravce, but was unable to play in the 2014–15 season. He scored a goal on his debut for the club on 15 August in a 2–2 home draw with Železiarne Podbrezová. On 19 September, Tawamba netted both his team's goals in a 2–5 away loss to Ružomberok. He subsequently scored a hat-trick to give his side a 3–1 win over Skalica on 21 November.

Kazakhstan
On 1 April 2016, Tawamba transferred to Kazakh club Kairat. He signed a one-plus-two-year contract and was awarded the number 20 shirt. On 29 May, Tawamba scored a stoppage-time back-heel winner to give his team a 3–2 win over Akzhayik. He subsequently made his debut in UEFA competitions, coming on as a substitute for Gerard Gohou in a 1–0 away win against Teuta Durrës in the first leg of the 2016–17 UEFA Europa League first qualifying round on 30 June. A week later in the return leg, Tawamba scored his team's fourth goal in an eventual 5–0 victory at home. He also netted a brace in a 3–2 away win against Irtysh Pavlodar on 17 July. One day before the league's final fixture, on 28 October, Tawamba terminated his contract with Kairat by mutual agreement. He made 29 appearances and scored six goals in all competitions.

Serbia
In November 2016, Tawamba moved to Serbia and signed a three-year contract with Partizan. He scored his first goal for the club in a 3–0 home league win over Metalac Gornji Milanovac on 8 March 2017. In his first Belgrade derby, Tawamba scored the team's second goal in an eventual 3–1 away win over Red Star Belgrade on 18 April. He eventually finished the season collecting the double.

On 22 July 2017, Tawamba scored a brace in the league's opener versus Mačva Šabac, as Partizan won the game 6–1. He also netted the opening goal in a 1–3 loss to Olympiacos in the first leg of the 2017–18 UEFA Champions League third qualifying round on 25 July. In the return leg of the 2017–18 UEFA Europa League play-off round, Tawamba scored the opener in a 4–0 away win against Videoton on 24 August, thus helping Partizan progress to the group stage. He subsequently found the back of the net in a 2–3 home loss to Dynamo Kyiv in Group B on 28 September. In the fourth game of the group stage, on 2 November, Tawamba scored a goal to give his team a 2–0 home win over Skënderbeu Korçë. He also scored the opener in a 2–1 home win over Young Boys, on 23 November, as Partizan advanced to the knockout stage after 13 years. With 19 goals in 51 appearances across all competitions, Tawamba finished the season as the team's top scorer, helping them win the 2017–18 Serbian Cup.

Saudi Arabia
In July 2018, Tawamba was transferred to Saudi club Al-Taawoun for a fee of €1.4 million. He was the team's top scorer in the 2018–19 season with 27 goals across all competitions.

International career
Tawamba was named in Cameroon's preliminary squad for the 2009 FIFA U-20 World Cup, but was later dropped from the final 21-man squad. He was also called up to the Cameroon U23 team in preparation for the 2011 All-Africa Games.

In March 2018, Tawamba received his first call-up to the Cameroon national team for a friendly against Kuwait, playing the full 90 minutes and receiving a yellow card in a 3–1 away victory.

Career statistics

Club

International

Honours
Partizan
 Serbian SuperLiga: 2016–17
 Serbian Cup: 2016–17, 2017–18
Al-Taawoun
 King Cup: 2019

Individual
 Saudi Professional League Player of the Month: November 2018, January 2021
King Cup Top goalscorer: 2020–21

References

External links

 
 

Aigle Royal Menoua players
Al-Ahly SC (Benghazi) players
Al-Taawoun FC players
Association football defenders
Association football forwards
Association football midfielders
Cameroon international footballers
Cameroon youth international footballers
Cameroonian expatriate footballers
Cameroonian expatriate sportspeople in Kazakhstan
Cameroonian expatriate sportspeople in Libya
Cameroonian expatriate sportspeople in Saudi Arabia
Cameroonian expatriate sportspeople in Serbia
Cameroonian expatriate sportspeople in Slovakia
Cameroonian expatriate sportspeople in South Africa
Cameroonian footballers
Elite One players
Expatriate footballers in Kazakhstan
Expatriate footballers in Libya
Expatriate footballers in Saudi Arabia
Expatriate footballers in Serbia
Expatriate footballers in Slovakia
Expatriate soccer players in South Africa
F.C. Cape Town players
FC Kairat players
FC Nitra players
FC ViOn Zlaté Moravce players
FK Partizan players
Kazakhstan Premier League players
MFK Ružomberok players
Mpumalanga Black Aces F.C. players
National First Division players
Saudi Professional League players
Serbian SuperLiga players
Slovak Super Liga players
Footballers from Yaoundé
Union Douala players
1989 births
Living people
Libyan Premier League players